Charles or Charlie Adams may refer to:

Academics
 Charles Kendall Adams (1835–1902), American educator and historian
 Charles Joseph Adams (1924–2011), American educator and academic
 Charles P. Adams (college president) (1873–1961), founding president of Grambling State University

Arts and entertainment
 Charles Warren Adams (1833–1903), English pioneer detective novelist, lawyer and anti-vivisectionist
 Charles Follen Adams (1842–1918), American poet
 Charles Partridge Adams (1858–1942), American landscape artist
 Charles James Adams (1859–1931), English landscape artist
 Charles Kingsley Adams (1899–1971), British civil servant; National Portrait Gallery director
 Charles R. Adams (1834–1900), American opera singer
 Charles Adams (1869–1937), pseudonym for Charles A. Prince, celesta soloist
 Charlie Adams (drummer) (born 1954), American drummer

Military
 Charles W. Adams (Confederate general) (1817–1878), Confederate States Army officer; grandfather of Helen Keller
 Charles Powell Adams (1831–1893), Brigadier General in the Union Army
 Charles W. Adams (Union general) (1834–1909), Union Army general during the American Civil War
 Charles Francis Adams Jr. (1835–1915), Civil War General and president of the Union Pacific Railroad
 Charles Adams (Colorado Indian agent) (1845–1895), American Civil War soldier and diplomat
 Charles J. Adams (U.S. Air Force general) (1921–2002), U.S. Air Force Brigadier General

Politics
 Charles Adams (1770–1800), son of John Adams; brother of John Quincy Adams
 Charles Adams (MP) (1753–1821), British Member of Parliament
 Charles C. Adams Jr. (born 1947), American diplomat, former ambassador, and lawyer
 Charles Francis Adams Sr. (1807–1886), grandson of John Adams, son of John Quincy Adams, U.S. congressman
 Charles H. Adams (New York politician) (1824–1902), U.S. Representative from New York
 Charles H. Adams (Massachusetts journalist) (1859–1952), American journalist and politician
 Charles Edward Adams (politician) (1867–1936), 25th Lieutenant Governor of Minnesota
 Charles Bayley Adams (1887–1961), Vermont politician, judge and attorney
 Charles J. Adams (Vermont politician) (1917–2008), Vermont politician and Attorney General
 Charles Francis Adams III (1866–1954), U.S. Navy secretary
 Charles Edward Adams (industrialist) (1881–1957), director of the Federal Reserve Bank of New York
 Charles Adams (Manitoba politician) (1858–1931), Canadian entrepreneur and Manitoba politician
 Charles Clinton Adams (1833–1906), American merchant and politician from New York

Science
 Charles Baker Adams (1814–1853), American naturalist and academic
 Charles Hitchcock Adams (1868–1951), American astronomer
 Charles Christopher Adams (1873–1955), American zoologist
 Charles William Adams (surveyor) (1840–1918), New Zealand surveyor, astronomer and public servant
 Charles Adams (seismologist) (1870–1945), New Zealand university lecturer, surveyor, astronomer and seismologist

Sports
 Babe Adams (Charles Benjamin Adams, 1882–1968), American baseball pitcher
 Charlie Adam (born 1985), Scottish football player
 Charles Adams (ice hockey) (1876–1947), Boston Bruins founder
 Charlie Adams (American football) (born 1979), American football player
 Charlie Adams (Australian footballer) (1897–1986), Australian rules football player
 Charlie Adams (English footballer) (born 1994), English football player

Other
 Charles Francis Adams IV (1910–1999), president of Raytheon
 Charles Gilchrist Adams (born 1936), American clergyman

Ships
 Charles F. Adams-class destroyer, a ship class
 USS Charles F. Adams

See also
 Charles Addams (1912–1988), American cartoonist
 Charlee Adams (born 1995), English football midfielder
 Charles Francis Adams (disambiguation)
 Charles Adam (disambiguation)
 Chuck Adams (born 1971), American tennis player
 Adams (surname)